Identity certificate may refer to:

Information technology
 Public key certificate
 Decentralized identifiers
 Self-sovereign identity

Identity documents
 Australian Certificate of Identity
 Bruneian International Certificate of Identity
 Canadian Certificate of Identity
 Hong Kong Document of Identity for Visa Purposes
 Hong Kong Certificate of Identity, issued prior to 1997
 Indian Identity Certificate
 Malaysian Certificate of Identity
 New Zealand Certificate of Identity
 Singapore Certificate of Identity